The 2010–11 Horizon League men's basketball season marks the 31st season of Horizon League basketball.

Preseason
In the preseason, Butler was the conference favorite – returning three starters from their NCAA runner-up team.  Butler received all first-place votes in the preseason poll of HL coaches, media, and sports information directors.  Detroit captured second in the preseason poll, and Cleveland State finished third for the second consecutive preseason.  The preseason player of the year was Shelvin Mack of Butler who was also named  to the John R. Wooden Award preseason candidate list.

HL Preseason Poll

Preseason All-Horizon

First Team
Shelvin Mack, Butler
Norris Cole, Cleveland State
Matt Howard, Butler
Rahmon Fletcher, Green Bay
Brandon Wood, Valparaiso

Second Team
Vaughn Duggins, Wright State
Eli Holman, Detroit
Cory Johnson, Valparaiso
Chase Simon, Detroit
Robo Kreps, UIC

Preseason Player of the Year 
Shelvin Mack, Butler

Conference awards and honors

Weekly awards
HL Players of the Week
Throughout the conference season, the HL offices name a player of the week.

All-Conference Honors

Tournament Honors

Matt Howard of Butler was named the tournament MVP for the second consecutive year and is the first Horizon League player to be named to the all-tournament team four times.

External links
HL Official website
Horizon League Network

References